The 1956 Hardin–Simmons Cowboys football team was an American football team that represented Hardin–Simmons University in the Border Conference during the 1956 NCAA University Division football season. In its second season under head coach Sammy Baugh, the team compiled a 4–6 record (1–3 against conference opponents), finished in fifth place in the conference, and was outscored by a total of 217 to 164.  The team played its home games at Parramore Stadium, also known as Parramore Field, in Abilene, Texas.

No Hardin-Simmons players were named to the 1956 All-Border Conference football team.

Schedule

References

Hardin-Simmons
Hardin–Simmons Cowboys football seasons
Hardin-Simmons Cowboys football